Converge / Dropdead  is a split EP by American bands Converge and Dropdead. The single was self-released commercially in digital and 7" vinyl formats by both of the bands on June 16, 2011, and will be distributed through Deathwish Inc. and Armageddon. Copies were also available during Converge and Dropdead's May/June 2011 tour with Trap Them and Burning Love.

Track listing 
Side A: Converge
 "Runaway" – 2:05
Side B: Dropdead
 "Paths of Glory" – 1:38

Personnel 
Converge
 Kurt Ballou – guitars
 Jacob Bannon – vocals
 Ben Koller – drum kit
 Nate Newton – bass guitar

Dropdead
 Ben Barnett – guitar
 Devon Cahill – bass
 Brian Mastrobuono – drums
 Bob Otis – vocals

Production and artwork
 Kurt Ballou – production on "Runaway" at Godcity in early 2011, co-production on "Paths of Glory" at Godcity from 2004–2011 
 Dropdead – co-production on "Paths of Glory"
 John Golden – mastering
 Jacob Bannon – artwork

References 

Converge (band) albums
Hardcore punk EPs
2011 EPs
Albums produced by Kurt Ballou
Albums with cover art by Jacob Bannon
Dropdead albums